Doe v. Trump may refer to:
Doe v. Trump (2016) (case 1:16-cv-07673-RA, United States District Court Southern District of New York, filed October 3, 2016), the child molestation charge tied to Jeffrey Epstein's Manhattan residence
Jane Doe, John Doe, et.al. v. Trump (case 2:17-cv-00178-JLR, United States District Court for the Western District of Washington, filed February 7, 2017), a challenge to the ban on travelers from predominantly Muslim countries
Doe v. Trump (2017) (case 1:17-cv-01597-CKK, United States District Court for the District of Columbia, filed August 28, 2017), a challenge to the ban on transgender military personnel